Staroaktau (İśke Aqtaw) is a rural locality (a selo) in Karansky Selsoviet, Buzdyaksky District, Bashkortostan, Russia. The population was 303 as of 2010. There are 6 streets.

Geography 
Staroaktau is located 23 km north of Buzdyak (the district's administrative centre) by road. Uranovo is the nearest rural locality.

References 

Rural localities in Buzdyaksky District